Tomáš Hájek (born 1 December 1991) is a Czech professional footballer who plays as a centre-back for SBV Vitesse.

Club career
Hájek made his career league debut for FC Fastav Zlín on 3 June 2011 in a 2–0 away loss at SK Kladno.

On 12 July 2019, SBV Vitesse announced that they had signed Hájek on a three-year contract.

References

External links 
 
 
 Career stats & Profile - Voetbal International

1991 births
Living people
Association football defenders
Czech footballers
Czech First League players
Eredivisie players
FC Fastav Zlín players
FC Hradec Králové players
FC Viktoria Plzeň players
SBV Vitesse players
Sportspeople from Zlín
FK Mladá Boleslav players